Negasilus is a genus of robber flies in the family Asilidae. There are about five described species in Negasilus.

Species
These five species belong to the genus Negasilus:
 Negasilus astutus (Williston, 1893) i c g b
 Negasilus belli Curran, 1934 i c g
 Negasilus cumbipilosus Adisoemarto, 1967 g
 Negasilus gramalis (Adisoemarto, 1967) i c g
 Negasilus platyceras (Hine, 1922) i c g
Data sources: i = ITIS, c = Catalogue of Life, g = GBIF, b = Bugguide.net

References

Further reading

 
 
 

Asilidae
Articles created by Qbugbot
Asilidae genera